Mammame is a 1986 French dance film directed by Chilean filmmaker Raúl Ruiz based on French choreographer Jean-Claude Gallotta's modern ballet of the same name. Critic Jonathan Rosenbaum argued that it "rivals The Red Shoes as the most intoxicating dance film ever made".

References

Further reading

External links

1986 films
French dance films
Films directed by Raúl Ruiz
1980s dance films
1980s French-language films
1980s French films